The Gilstrap Baronetcy, of Fornham St Genevieve in the County of Suffolk and of the High Beeches in the Parish of Slaugham in the County of Sussex, was a title in the Baronetage of the United Kingdom.

It was created in Queen Victoria's 1887 Golden Jubilee Honours on 28 July 1887 for the prominent maltster and philanthropist William Gilstrap, who endowed the Gilstrap library in Newark. The title became extinct on his death in 1896. He is buried in the churchyard of St. Martin's parish church in Fornham St. Martin, Suffolk, England.

Gilstrap baronets, of Fornham St Genevieve and of the High Beeches (1887)
Sir William Gilstrap, 1st Baronet (1816–1896)

References

Extinct baronetcies in the Baronetage of the United Kingdom